Sussex Day is the county day for the historic county of Sussex in southern England and is celebrated on 16 June each year to celebrate the rich heritage and culture of Sussex.

The event takes place on St Richard's Day, the feast day of St Richard of Chichester, Sussex's patron saint.  The date marks the anniversary of the translation of St Richard's body from its original burial place in the nave of Chichester Cathedral to an elaborate shrine at the cathedral on 16 June 1276.

Origins
The idea of Sussex Day came from Worthing resident Ian Steedman who in 2006 suggested the idea to politician Henry Smith, at the time leader of West Sussex County Council.  Smith liked the idea and West Sussex County Council officially recognised the day in 2007.

Celebrations
Since 2013, the Sussex Flag is flown in each of the six ancient Rapes, or sub-divisions of Sussex in the week running up to Sussex Day.  The Sussex Martlets flag was hoisted over the Council House in Chichester, from Maltravers Street in Arundel, from St Nicholas’ Church in Bramber, from Lewes Castle, from St Nicholas’ Church in Pevensey, and from Hastings Castle; each representing their respective historic division of Sussex.

Several other towns and villages across the county raise the Sussex Flag on 16 June, including Peacehaven, Seaford, Newhaven, Shoreham and Worthing.  The West Sussex village of Slindon also flies the flag. At Newhaven and Petworth, the Sussex Charter is read out and "Sussex by the Sea", Sussex's unofficial county anthem, is sung.  In 2013, at the Weald and Downland Open Air Museum in Singleton, an event took place celebrating Sussex culture including Sussex's buildings, stoolball, Sussex literature and history, as well as traditional Sussex music and food from Sussex.  Events to celebrate Sussex Day in 2013 were also held in the towns of Worthing and Bexhill-on-Sea.

In 2017, Sussex Day was officially celebrated in style at Beauport Park Golf Club, St Leonards with a full day of events.  The event was organised jointly by The Beauport Park Golf Club and one of the Hastings Ambassadors, self-styled 'Lord' Brett McLean.  McLean said,  “Sussex Day is an important day of celebrations held on the birthday of St Richard the Patron Saint of Sussex,” he said. “The aim is to showcase all that’s positive about Sussex. It allows the opportunity to engage and link community organisations, businesses, entertainment and charities together helping to celebrate the achievements of these organisations that serve our county.”

Sussex Charter
On Sussex Day, readings of the Sussex Charter have taken place at some towns in Sussex, including Crowborough, Heathfield, Newhaven and Petworth.

For all the people of the ancient kingdom of Sussex!

Let it be known: the 16 June of each and every year shall be known as Sussex Day.

Sussex day shall be celebrated according to the rites and traditions of Sussex.
 
Let it be known all the people of Sussex shall be responsible for the maintenance of those boundaries that join to those of our neighbours.
 
Let it be known all the people of Sussex shall be responsible for all the environs within those boundaries.
 
Let it be known, the people of Sussex shall recognise the inshore waters that lie inside a line drawn from Beachy Head, and extending to Selsey Bill as being, the Bay of Sussex.

Let it be known, the people of Sussex will undertake responsibility for the general well being of our neighbours.

Let it be known the people of Sussex shall be guardians of our wildlife.
 
Let it be known the people of Sussex will, through custom support all local business.

Finally, let it be known, as guardians of Sussex, we all know Sussex is Sussex … and Sussex won’t be druv!

In God we trust.

God Save the King!

See also
 Culture of Sussex
 List of county days in England

References

External links
 Link to Spirit of Sussex Day Video on West Sussex County Council website
 Official Sussex Day website

Sussex
June observances
Events in East Sussex
Events in West Sussex
Annual events in England